Christian Matthew Michalak (born January 4, 1971) is an American former Major League Baseball (MLB) left-handed pitcher who played for the Arizona Diamondbacks, Toronto Blue Jays, Texas Rangers, and Cincinnati Reds between 1998 and 2006, and a current MiLB coach.

Amateur career
A native of Joliet, Illinois, Michalak attended Joliet Catholic Academy and the University of Notre Dame. In 1991, he played collegiate summer baseball with the Chatham A's of the Cape Cod Baseball League.

Professional career
Michalak was selected by the Oakland Athletics in the 12th round of the 1993 MLB Draft. He signed as a free agent with the Arizona Diamondbacks in 1997, and made his major league debut with Arizona in 1998. His most productive season came in 2001, when he tossed 136.2 innings while splitting time for the Toronto Blue Jays and Texas Rangers. His final major league appearance came in 2006 for the Cincinnati Reds.

Michalak played for the Washington Nationals Triple-A affiliate, the Columbus Clippers, in 2007. On June 14, 2008, Michalak signed a minor league contract with the Florida Marlins and was assigned to their Triple-A affiliate, the Albuquerque Isotopes. After his release from the Marlins organization, he signed with the Oakland Athletics and assigned to their Double-A affiliate, the Midland RockHounds, on August 2, 2008. He became a free agent at the end of the season. On April 26, 2009, Michalak signed a minor league deal with the Toronto Blue Jays.

Coaching career
On December 4, 2009, Michalak was named the pitching coach for the Hagerstown Suns. This was the beginning of a career that brought him to the Albuquerque Isotopes, the Triple-A affiliate of the Colorado Rockies, in 2021.

References

External links

1971 births
Living people
Albuquerque Dukes players
Albuquerque Isotopes players
American expatriate baseball players in Canada
Arizona Diamondbacks players
Baseball coaches from Illinois
Baseball players from Illinois
Chatham Anglers players
Cincinnati Reds players
Colorado Springs Sky Sox players
Columbus Clippers players
Durham Bulls players
Edmonton Trappers players
Frisco RoughRiders players
High Desert Mavericks players
Huntsville Stars players
Indianapolis Indians players
Louisville Bats players
Major League Baseball pitchers
Minor league baseball coaches
Modesto A's players
Notre Dame Fighting Irish baseball players
Oklahoma RedHawks players
Pawtucket Red Sox players
Southern Oregon A's players
Sportspeople from Joliet, Illinois
Texas Rangers players
Toronto Blue Jays players
Tucson Sidewinders players
Tulsa Drillers players
West Michigan Whitecaps players